Iles is a surname. Notable people with the surname include:

Albert Iles (1914–1979), English footballer
Alex Iles, American musician
Bob Iles (born 1955), English footballer
Bradley Iles (born 1983), New Zealand golfer
Brian Iles, American animation writer
Edna Iles (1905–2003), English classical pianist 
Elijah Iles (1796-1883), American pioneer and businessman
Francis Iles (1893-1971), English crime writer (real name: Anthony Berkeley Cox) 
Greg Iles (born 1960), American writer
James Iles (born 1990), English cricketer
Jon Iles (born 1954), English actor
Nikki Iles (born 1963), English musician
Ray K Iles, British scientist
Richard Iles (born 1962), English musician
Salim Iles (born 1975), Algerian swimmer
Sam Iles (born 1987), Australian footballer

See also
Iles, Nariño, town and municipality in Colombia
 , the French term for "islands"
Lles (disambiguation)